Shivaay is a 2016 Indian Hindi-language action thriller film directed and produced by Ajay Devgn under his banner Ajay Devgn FFilms. The story and screenplay are written by Sandeep Shrivastava and the film stars Ajay Devgn in the lead titular role along with debutante actresses Sayyeshaa, Abigail Eames and Erika Kaar in lead roles. Mithoon composed the film's score and soundtrack. British band The Vamps and composer Jasleen Royal also contributed to the music. This movie was heavily inspired from the 2008 French-American movie Taken and is a loose adaptation of this movie.

Shivaay was released on 28 October 2016 on the Diwali weekend. It ran for more than 50 days at the box office. It won the 64th National Film Award for Best Special Effects in 2017. It was screened at the 2017 Shanghai International Film Festival on 17 June 2017.

Plot 
Shivaay (Ajay Devgn) is a skilled mountaineer who makes a living by providing treks and climbing expeditions to tourists. One day he meets Olga (Erika Kaar) and saves her from an avalanche. They eventually fall in love. Olga becomes pregnant but doesn't want the child. Shivaay begs her to give him the child, after which he will not stop her. Nine years later, Shivaay leads a happy life with his mute daughter Gaura (Abigail Eames) until she discovers that Olga is still alive and in Bulgaria. Gaura insists Shivaay be taken to Bulgaria, and despite his old sorrows, Shivaay finally agrees to take her to Bulgaria, where he saves one young child from child traffickers. Shivaay seeks the Indian embassy's help in tracing Olga and is assigned to Anu (Sayyesha Saigal).

The traffickers, led by the baron Ustinov and his right-hand man, the unseen Changez, come after Shivaay and kidnap Gaura. Shivaay chases the van, destroying various cars but loses the van and is arrested by the Bulgarian police, charged with murder and trafficking. While in the police van, Shivaay imagines the officers in the van to be the same masked traffickers, attacks them, throwing out every single officer. The van accidentally falls off a dam, and the police think that Shivaay is dead. But Shivaay escapes by jumping from the van due to his skills and survives.

Shivaay brings one of the saved prostitutes from a brothel to Anu's home to help her out. Anu, who misunderstood Shivaay earlier, agrees to help him. Olga, having now seen television coverage of Shivaay, meets him and joins him. They seek Wahab (Vir Das) help to recover CCTV footage Shivaay's various chases. Ivanovich, Ustinov's henchman, is beaten badly when he arrives there, after which he reveals Ustinov's location, where Shivaay discovers that Gaura has been taken away to be sold into the flesh trade.

Shivaay chases after the transport van carrying his daughter off to Romania. A prolonged and vicious fight ensues as Changez, now revealed to be Captain Nikolai of the Bulgarian Police, attacks Shivaay but gets killed by the latter. Gaura is reunited with Olga, who is now married to a wealthy Bulgarian and can provide Gaura with every comfort. Shivaay doesn't want to lose Gaura, but, seeing as Olga now beseeches him, he heavy-heartedly leaves for the airport, where Gaura arrives &, requesting not to leave her, runs into his arms.

Cast 
Ajay Devgn as Shivaay, a tourist guide, mountaineer and Gaura's father
Sayyeshaa as Anushka, a budding IFS officer at the Indian embassy in Sofia, Bulgaria
Erika Kaar as Olga, Shivaay's former lover and the mother of Gaura
Abigail Eames as Gaura (Maharishi Gaura), Shivaay's young daughter with his former lover, Olga
Vir Das as Wahab, an expert computer hacker who has a crush on Anushka
Girish Karnad as Anushka's father
Markus Ertelt as Changez/Sgt. Nikolai
Saurabh Shukla as Sharma, Anushka's boss in the Indian embassy in Sofia, Bulgaria
Bijou Thaangjam as Kancha, Shivaay's friend

Production 

The shooting of the film started in November 2014, with the majority shot in Mussoorie, Bulgaria and Hyderabad.

Release 
Shivaay released on 28 October 2016. It released internationally in 60 countries including Germany, France, Italy, Austria, Switzerland, Denmark, and Chile. However, the film was not released in Pakistan.

The film's runtime was later reduced by 19 minutes, and the new trimmed version was released in cinemas.

Piracy issue 
On 27 October 2016, The Indian Express published that self-proclaimed film critic Kamaal R Khan had uploaded the opening sequence of the film on Twitter, which he shot in a theater in Dubai. Devgn, the producer, was quoted saying that he would take legal action against Khan.

Reception

Critical reception 
Bollywood Hungama gave Shivaay 3.5/5 stars. "Shivaay is a perfect emotional thriller that scores high on the account of its breathtaking visuals, amazing action and a high octane performance". Dainik Jagran rated the film 3.5/5, describing it as "full of emotion and action." The Times of India gave the film 3/5, praising the cinematography but criticizing the 3-hour runtime which was later trimmed. Mumbai Mirror also rated the film 3/5, stating that the film "scores fairly on most accounts." Bollywood Life rated the film 3/5, writing "Ajay Devgn's directorial is all about its stunning visuals and breath taking action scenes." BookMyShow reviewed the film and called the film a "perfect Diwali gift you can give yourself and your family this (Diwali) weekend."

Rajeev Masand for News 18 gave the film 2 stars out of 5 and wrote, "What Ajay Devgan the star deserved, was a sharper director and a better script. In the end, there's little else to Shivaay than the eye-watering locations (both in the Himalayas and in Bulgaria), and occasionally poignant moments between Devgan and the little girl who plays his daughter. Everything else is noise. Way too much noise." Writing for The Hindu, Namrata Joshi commented that the movie moves too slow, and "turns out almost three hours long with just a wisp of a story." Anna MM Vetticad of Firstpost described it as a heavy-handed, over-stretched film.
Rating the film 1.5 stars out of 5, Ananya Bhattacharya of IndiaToday.in praised the cinematography but criticized the writing. Raja Sen of Rediff.com gave the film 1 out 5, calling it an "absolute catastrophe". Shubhra Gupta of Indian Express wrote in a 1 out of 5-star review, "The only thing your eye can rest on is the spectacular scenery. The rest is a bloated star vehicle."

Box office 

India 
Shivaay was released alongside Ranbir Kapoor's Ae Dil Hai Mushkil and collected 102.4 million from India on its opening day, which was less than Ae Dil Hai Mushkils 13.30 crore domestic first day. Shivaay grossed more than  1.39 billion.

Overseas 

Soundtrack

Shivaays soundtrack was composed by Mithoon with a guest vocal appearance by the British pop-rock band The Vamps. The lyrics were penned by Sayeed Quadri and Sandeep Shrivastava.

On 11 September 2016 the title track, "Bolo Har Har Har", was released, sung by Mithoon, Mohit Chauhan, Sukhwinder Singh, Badshah, Megha Sriram Dalton, and Anugrah. The second song, "Darkhaast", was released on 22 September 2016, and featured vocals by Arijit Singh and Sunidhi Chauhan.

All music rights of Shivaay were acquired by T-Series.

Track listing

Awards

Game 
An official game based on this film has been released by Zapak Mobile Games Pvt. Ltd, for Android mobile phone users.

References

External links 
 
 Shivaay at Bollywood Hungama
 

2016 action drama films
2016 action thriller films
Films scored by Jasleen Royal
2010s chase films
Indian action drama films
Indian action thriller films
Indian chase films
2016 films
Films shot in Hyderabad, India
Films shot in Bulgaria
2010s Hindi-language films
Films set in Bulgaria
Films about child prostitution
Films about human trafficking in India
Films about child abduction in India
Films scored by Mithoon
Human trafficking in Bulgaria
Films shot in Mussoorie
Reliance Entertainment films
Films that won the Best Special Effects National Film Award
Ajay Devgn
Avalanches in film